Chung Serang (정세랑) is a South Korean science fiction and fantasy writer. She won the 7th Changbi Novel Award in 2013, and Hankook Ilbo Literary Award in 2017. Before her debut, she worked as an editor in Minumsa and Munkandongne. At the age of 26, She was the youngest Korean writer to have her books translated into Japanese. Her novel, School Nurse An Eunyoung (보건교사 안은영) was made into a Netflix original series.

Works in Korean (partial) 
Novels

 덧니가 보고 싶어 (I want to see your Snaggletooth) (2011)
 지구에서 한아뿐 (Only Han-ah on Earth) (2012)
 이만큼 가까이 (This Closer) (2014)
 재인, 재욱, 재훈 (Jaein, Jaeuk, Jaehun) (2014)
 보건교사 안은영 (School Nurse An Eunyeong) (2015)
 피프티 피플 (Fifty People) (2016)

Short story collections

 옥상에서 만나요 (Meet at the balcony) (2017)

Awards 

 2013 Changbi Novel Award
 2017 Hankook Ilbo Literary Award

References 

1984 births
Living people
21st-century South Korean women writers
South Korean science fiction writers
People from Seoul
South Korean novelists